The Cannabis Party or The Hemp Party is a single issue, local political party in Denmark. The party stands for the legalisation of cannabis.

History
The party was founded in 2001 with the only goal to legalise cannabis in Denmark.

The party has run in all municipal elections since its foundation, as well as the elections for regional councils in 2009 and 2013. 
They intend to run in a Folketing election, but have not yet managed to do so.

Election results

Municipal councils

Amt & Regional elections

References

Local political parties in Denmark
Political parties established in 2001
Cannabis political parties
2001 in cannabis
2001 establishments in Denmark
Cannabis in Denmark